Cychrus miroslavi is a species of ground beetle in the subfamily of Carabinae. It was described by Deuve in 2006.

References

miroslavi
Beetles described in 2006